Havareh Khul (also Romanized as Havāreh Khūl; also known as Havāreh Khowr and Havarikhūr) is a village in Buin Rural District, Nanur District, Baneh County, Kurdistan Province, Iran. At the 2006 census, its population was 160, in 29 families. The village is populated by Kurds.

References 

Towns and villages in Baneh County
Kurdish settlements in Kurdistan Province